Indira Banerjee is a former Judge of the Supreme Court of India and the 8th female Judge in history of Supreme Court of India . Previously, she has served as Chief Justice of Madras High Court, the second woman to hold the position in India.

Early life
Indira Banerjee was born on 24 September 1957. She did her schooling at the Loreto House in Kolkata. She pursued her higher education at the Presidency College, Kolkata and Department of Law, University of Calcutta.

She was enrolled as an advocate on 5 July 1985 and practised before the Calcutta High Court.

Judicial career
Indira Banerjee was appointed a permanent Judge of the Calcutta High Court on 5 February 2002 and transferred to the Delhi High Court with effect from 8 August 2016. She was elevated as the Chief Justice of the Madras High Court and assumed charge on 5 April 2017.

Justice Banerjee succeeded Justice Sanjay Kishan Kaul as the Chief Justice of the Madras High Court, after she was elevated to the Supreme Court of India. She is the second woman to head the chartered High Court, after Justice Kanta Kumari Bhatnagar who headed the Court between June and November 1992. She was elevated as Judge of Supreme Court of India on 7 August 2018. She was retired on 23 September 2022.

References

1957 births
Living people
Justices of the Supreme Court of India
Judges of the Calcutta High Court
Chief Justices of the Madras High Court
Judges of the Delhi High Court
20th-century Indian lawyers
20th-century Indian women lawyers
21st-century Indian judges
21st-century Indian women judges
University of Calcutta alumni
People from Kolkata